Rakesh Daultabad is an Indian politician. He was elected to the Haryana Legislative Assembly from Badshahpur in the 2019 Haryana Legislative Assembly election as a member and Independent candidate. Daultabad defeated Manish Yadav of Bharatiya Janata Party. He is the founder of Parivartan Sangh, an organisation that aims at facilitating healthcare, improving education levels, empowering women and taking several other community initiatives. Improving Badshahpur's educational standards and healthcare and encouraging youth to enter politics are some of the key issues Daultabad focuses on.

References 

1980 births
Living people
Bharatiya Janata Party politicians from Haryana
People from Gurgaon
Haryana MLAs 2019–2024